Dark Star or Darkstar may refer to:

Astronomy 
 Dark star (Newtonian mechanics), a star that has a gravitational pull strong enough to trap light under Newtonian gravity
 Dark star (dark matter), a star heated by annihilation of dark matter particles within it
 Dark-energy star, an object composed of dark energy that outwardly resembles a black hole

Media and entertainment

Film 
 The Dark Star (1919 film), a lost 1919 silent film
 The Dark Star (1955 film), a 1955 West German drama film
 Dark Star (film), a 1974 science fiction comedy film directed by John Carpenter
 Dark Star, a 1978 film distributed by David Grant
 Dark Star: H. R. Giger's World, a 2014 Swiss documentary
 "Darkstar", a fictional military aircraft in the 2022 film Top Gun: Maverick

Literature

Comics 
 Darkstar (Marvel Comics), a Marvel Comics superhero
 Darkstars, a DC Comics superhero team
 Darkstar Comics, a fictional comic book company in the TV series Spaced
 Dark Star, an issue of the comics series The Transformers

Other 
 Dark Star, a 1929 novel by Lorna Moon
 Dark Star, a 1985 biography about John Gilbert written by his daughter Leatrice Joy-Gilbert
 Dark Star, a novelization of the 1974 film, by Alan Dean Foster
 Dark Star: The Roy Orbison Story, a 1990 book by Ellis Amburn
 Dark Star, a 1991 Night Soldiers novel by Alan Furst
 Darkstar (Ben 10), a character in the Ben 10 franchise
 Darkstar, a 2011 novella by Christopher R. Howard

Music

Performers 
 Dark Star (band), an English psychedelic rock band, 1998–2001
 Darkstar (band), an English electronic duo, formed 2007
 Dark Star Orchestra, a Grateful Dead tribute band
 Darkstar, a progressive metal band co-founded by Dan Rock of Psychotic Waltz

Albums 
 Dark Star (soundtrack), by John Carpenter, 1980
 Dark Star, by Deine Lakaien, 1991
 Dark Star, by The Supernaturals, 1993
 Dark Star: The Music of the Grateful Dead, by the David Murray Octet, 1996
 Dark Star (album), by the Grateful Dead and featuring their song "Dark Star", 2012
 Dark Star, by Jaymes Young, 2013

Songs 
 "Dark Star" (song), by the Grateful Dead
 "Dark Star", by Beck from The Information
 "Dark Star", by Cinema Bizarre from ToyZ
 "Dark Star", by Crosby, Stills & Nash from CSN
 "Dark Star", by Delerium from Faces, Forms & Illusions
 "Dark Star", by Hypnogaja from Truth Decay
 "Dark Star", by I Am Kloot from Natural History
 "Dark Star", by Mike Oldfield from Tubular Bells II
 "Dark Star", by Poliça from Give You the Ghost
 "Dark Star", by Tarja Turunen from What Lies Beneath
 "Dark Star", by Jaymes Young from his album of the same name

Video games 
 DarkStar One, a 2006 video game
 Darkstar: The Interactive Movie, a 2010 video game
 Dark Star (No More Heroes), a character in the video game No More Heroes
 Dark Star, a malevolent artifact in the video game Mario & Luigi: Bowser's Inside Story
 Dark Star (1984 video game), a 3D space shoot 'em up for the ZX Spectrum written by Simon Brattel for Design Design Software
 Darkstar, special weapon in a Sci-Fi MMOFPS PlanetSide 2

Technology 
 Lockheed Martin RQ-3 DarkStar, an unmanned aerial vehicle
 Project Darkstar, a framework for creating massively multiplayer online games
 Tesla Roadster (2008), codenamed DarkStar, an electric sports car

Other uses 
 Dark Star Brewery, West Sussex, England
 Dark Star (cave), a cave system in Uzbekistan
 Dark Star (horse), an American Thoroughbred racehorse

See also 

 
 
 
 
 
 
 
 Black Star (disambiguation)
 Black Sun (disambiguation)
 Dark Sun (disambiguation)
 Dark (disambiguation)
 Star (disambiguation)